Yuancun station may refer to:

 Yuancun station (Guangzhou Metro), a station on Line 5 and Line 21 of Guangzhou Metro
 Yuancun station (Shijiazhuang Metro), a station on Line 2 (Shijiazhuang Metro)